"Don't Let It Go to Waste" is a song by Matt Willis, released on 11 December 2006 as the third single from his debut solo album of the same name. Several days before the single's release, Willis was announced as the winner of the reality TV-show I'm a Celebrity, Get Me Out Of Here!, a show Willis admitted going on purely to boost his music career.

Despite his efforts on the show, the single charted at No. 19.

Track listing

Charts

References

2006 songs
2006 singles
Matt Willis songs
Songs written by Jason Perry (singer)
Songs written by Julian Emery
Songs written by Matt Willis
Mercury Records singles